Francis Warre Warre-Cornish (8 May 1839 – 28 August 1916) was a British schoolmaster, scholar and writer.

Life
He was the son of Hubert Kestell Cornish, vicar of Bakewell, and his wife Louisa Warre, daughter of Francis Warre (1775–1854), and was educated at Eton College and King's College, Cambridge. He was a master (1861) and subsequently Vice-Provost of Eton, from 1893 to 1916. He resigned from Eton in April 1916 and died in August 1916.

Warre-Cornish married Blanche Ritchie, who was celebrated for her conversational powers and eccentricities. By her, he was the father of the writer Mary (Molly) MacCarthy, known for her involvement in the Bloomsbury Group, and Gerald Warre-Cornish author of St Paul from the Trenches.

Selected works
Extracts from the Letters and Journals of William Cory [i.e. William Johnson Cory], author of 'Ionica'. Selected and arranged by Francis Warre Cornish, 1897
A Concise Dictionary of Greek and Roman Antiquities, 1898, based on William Smith's Dictionary
(Translator) The Poems of Gaius Valerius Catullus, 1904
Chivalry, 1908
A History of the English Church in the Nineteenth Century, 2 volumes, 1910
Darwell Stories, 1910
Jane Austen, English Men of Letters, second series, 1913
Life of Oliver Cromwell, 1882
Sunningwell [A novel], 1899

References

Concise Dictionary of National Biography

1839 births
1916 deaths
19th-century British writers
20th-century British writers
19th-century British educators
20th-century British educators
Alumni of King's College, Cambridge
Fellows of King's College, Cambridge
People educated at Eton College
Teachers at Eton College